Tamer Oyguç (born January 11, 1966 in Malatya Turkey) is a former Turkish professional basketball player. He finished his Army Duty in Ankara (Etimesgut) as a player of Karagücü National Team. He has 2nd division winner at this team. He spent most of his career with Efes Pilsen. The former center is 2.10 m tall and wore the number 13 jersey for all teams he played on. In his playing times, he was famous for his hook shots.

International career
Oyguç is a former Turkish national team center.

External links
TBLStat.net Profile
TurkSports.Net Profile 

1966 births
Living people
Turkish men's basketball players
Anadolu Efes S.K. players
Fenerbahçe men's basketball players
Beşiktaş men's basketball players
Galatasaray S.K. (men's basketball) players
Centers (basketball)